The Great Game of Politics: Why We Elect, Whom We Elect is a 2004 political science book by Dick Stoken that discusses the history and details of the Presidency of the United States from George Washington to George W. Bush.

Reception 
Reception of The Great Game of Politics was generally critical.

Kirkus Reviews stated that The Great Game of Politics was an "Amateurish exercise in political history, turning on half-correct assumptions and half-formed arguments."

Publishers Weekly states "Serious students of the American presidency will find Stoken's thinking a bit simplistic as well as present-minded. And Stoken, an investor who has written several investment books . . . , writes more like a motivational speaker — he's prone to exclamation points — than a historian. But less-schooled readers may find some help in thinking about the approaching 2004 election."

References

External links 

Interview with Dick Stoken about his book The Great Game of Politics at The Washington Post
The Great Game of Politics: Why We Elect, Whom We Elect at WorldCat
 The Great Game of Politics: Why We Elect, Whom We Elect at Trove

2004 non-fiction books
Political science books
Books about politics of the United States
Macmillan Publishers books